Veresa Toma (born 26 August 1981) is a Fijian footballer who plays as a midfielder for Fijian club Rewa F.C. He has also played in Singapore, Australia and Papua New Guinea.

He has represented the Fiji national football team and led the all goalscorers with 7 goals at the 2004 OFC Nations Cup.

Private life
Veresa is the brother of Viliame Dawai and the uncle of Fijian U20 captain and Nadi rep. Mataiasi Toma

References

External links

1981 births
Living people
Fijian footballers
Fiji international footballers
Fijian expatriate footballers
Rewa F.C. players
Navua F.C. players
Hekari United players
Nadi F.C. players
Gombak United FC players
Expatriate soccer players in Australia
Expatriate footballers in Papua New Guinea
Expatriate footballers in Singapore
Fijian expatriate sportspeople in Australia
Fijian expatriate sportspeople in Papua New Guinea
Fijian expatriate sportspeople in Singapore
Association football midfielders
Singapore Premier League players
Oakleigh Cannons FC players
2002 OFC Nations Cup players
2004 OFC Nations Cup players